Gaullism is a French political stance based on the thought and action of World War II French Resistance leader Charles de Gaulle, who would become the founding President of the Fifth French Republic. De Gaulle withdrew French forces from the NATO Command Structure, forced the removal of Allied bases from France, and initiated France's own independent nuclear deterrent programme. His actions were predicated on the view that France would not be subordinate to other nations.

According to Serge Berstein, Gaullism is "neither a doctrine nor a political ideology" and cannot be considered either left or right. Rather, "considering its historical progression, it is a pragmatic exercise of power that is neither free from contradictions nor of concessions to momentary necessity, even if the imperious word of the general gives to the practice of Gaullism the allure of a programme that seems profound and fully realised". Gaullism is "a peculiarly French phenomenon, without doubt the quintessential French political phenomenon of the 20th century".

Lawrence D. Kritzman argues that Gaullism may be seen as a form of French patriotism in the tradition of Jules Michelet. He writes: "Aligned on the political spectrum with the right, Gaullism was committed nevertheless to the republican values of the Revolution, and so distanced itself from the particularist ambitions of the traditional right and its xenophobic causes". Furthermore, "Gaullism saw as its mission the affirmation of national sovereignty and unity, which was diametrically opposed to the divisiveness created by the leftist commitment to class struggle".

Gaullism was nationalistic. In the early post-WWII period, Gaullists advocated for retaining the French Empire. De Gaulle shifted his stance on empire in the mid-1950s, suggesting potential federal arrangements or self-determination and membership in the French Community.

History 
Berstein writes that Gaullism has progressed in multiple stages:
The first phase (1940–45) occurred during World War II. In this period, Gaullism is identified with those French who rejected the armistice with Nazi Germany and the Vichy collaborators led by Philippe Pétain, and joined with General Charles de Gaulle and the Free French Forces, who sought to put France back in the war on the Allied side.
 In the second phase (1946–1958), Gaullism was a type of opposition to the Fourth French Republic. Gaullists in this period challenged the unstable parliamentary government of the Fourth Republic and advocated its replacement with "a president of the republic with preeminent constitutional powers."
 In the third phase (1958–69), "Gaullism was nothing other than the support given to the general's own politics after he returned to power in 1958 and served as president of the newly formed Fifth Republic from 1959 until his resignation in 1969."

Since 1969, Gaullism has been used to describe those identified as heirs to de Gaulle's ideas. The Cross of Lorraine, used by the Resistant Free France (1940–1944) during World War II, has served as the symbol of many Gaullist parties and movements, including the Rally of the French People (1947–1955), the Union for the New Republic (1958–1967), or the Rally for the Republic (1976–2002).

Principles

Strong state 
The "fundamental principle" of Gaullism is a "certain idea of France" as a strong state. In his War Memoirs, de Gaulle describes France as "an indomitable entity, a 'person' with whom a mystical dialogue was maintained throughout history. The goal of Gaullism, therefore, is to give precedence to its interests, to ensure that the voice is heard, to make it respected, and to assure its survival … to remain worthy of its past, the nation must endow itself with a powerful state." Kritzman writes that "the Gaullist idea of France set out to restore the honor of the nation and affirm its grandeur and independence" with de Gaulle seeking to "construct a messianic vision of France's historic destiny, reaffirm its prestige in the world, and transcend the national humiliations of the past." Accordingly, de Gaulle urged French unity over divisive "partisan quarrels" and emphasized French heritage, including both the Ancien Régime and the Revolution. The French political figures most admired by de Gaulle "were those responsible for national consensus—Louis XIV, Napoleon, Georges Clemenceau—who saw as their goal the creation of political and social unity by a strong state."

In order to strengthen France, Gaullists also emphasize the need for "a strong economy and a stable society." Gaullism believes, according to Berstein, that "it is the imperative of the state, as guardian of the national interest, to give impetus to economic growth and to guide it. Liberal opinion is accepted if it promises more efficiency than planning. As for social justice, so long as its natural distrust of big business can be allayed, it is less a matter of doctrine than a means of upholding stability. To put an end to class struggle, Gaullists hope to make use of participation, a nineteenth-century concept of which the general spoke frequently, but which he allowed his associates to ignore."

As part of a strong state, de Gaulle highlighted the necessity to found state institutions on a strong executive, contrasting with the French republican tradition, which emphasized the role of the elected assembly. During his time in office, de Gaulle sought to establish authority by holding direct universal votes and popular referendums and by directly engaging with the nation (via speeches broadcast over radio, press conferences, and trips to the provinces). Even though he frequently spoke on his respect for democracy, his political opponents perceived in his rule a tendency toward dictatorial power; many feared a Bonapartist revival or a republican monarchy. France remained a democracy, however, and de Gaulle's decision to step down as president following voters' rejection of the April 1969 constitutional referendum showed that his commitment to democratic principles was not merely a rhetorical ploy.

French exceptionalism 
In foreign policy, Gaullists are identified with both realism and French exceptionalism, and de Gaulle sought to impose French influence on the global order. Gaullists supported decolonization, which freed France from the burden of empire. This was reflected in de Gaulle's resolution of the Algeria crisis (1958–62), which was strongly influenced by de Gaulle's realpolitik, or "keen sense of political expediency." Realizing that decolonization was inevitable, and that a continued crisis and extended Algerian War would harm the French economy and perpetuate national disunity, "de Gaulle felt that it was in France's best interests to grant independence and desist from military engagement," thereby preserving French unity and grandeur.

Gaullists emphasize the need for France to "guarantee its national independence without resorting to allies whose interests might not coincide with those of France." The development of independent French nuclear capability, undertaken at significant effort despite much international criticism, was an outgrowth of this worldview. However, de Gaulle simultaneously initiated one of the first international nonproliferation efforts by quietly unshackling and distancing the French program from a diplomatically troublesome secret involvement with an Israeli junior partner, attempting to demilitarize and open to international oversight the Israeli nuclear arms program.

France under de Gaulle sought to avoid a post-World War II bipolar global political order dominated by the two superpowers of the United States and the Soviet Union, and sought to avoid dependence on the United States. Kritzman writes: "Gaullist foreign policy was motivated by its need to distinguish itself from … the two great superpowers. Paradoxically, [de Gaulle] desired to be part of the Western alliance and be critical of it at the same time on key issues such as defense." Most notably, de Gaulle withdrew France from North Atlantic Treaty Organization (NATO) military operations in 1966, and directed non-French NATO troops to leave France, although France remained a NATO member. Gaullists were also critical of the overseas economic influence of the U.S. and the role of the U.S. dollar in the international monetary system. Under de Gaulle, France established diplomatic relations with China earlier than most other Western nations; imposed an arms embargo against Israel (1967); and denounced American imperialism in the Third World.

De Gaulle and the Gaullists did not support Europe as a supranational entity, but did favour European integration in the form of "a confederation of sovereign states mutually engaged in "common policy, autonomous from the superpowers," and significantly influenced by France. De Gaulle's hopes to advance this sort of union largely failed, however, "in the face of the desire of the other European powers to remain closely allied to the United States."

Political legacy after de Gaulle 
De Gaulle's political legacy has been profound in France and has gradually influenced the entirety of the political spectrum. His successor as president, Georges Pompidou, consolidated Gaullism during his term from 1969 to 1974. Once-controversial Gaullist ideas have become accepted as part of the French political consensus and "are no longer the focus of political controversy." For instance, the strong presidency was maintained by all of de Gaulle's successors, including the socialist François Mitterrand (1981–1995). French independent nuclear capability and a foreign policy influenced by Gaullism–although expressed "in more flexible terms"–remains "the guiding force of French international relations." During the 2017 presidential election, de Gaulle's legacy was claimed by candidates ranging from the radical left to the radical right, including Jean-Luc Mélenchon, Benoît Hamon, Emmanuel Macron, François Fillon and Marine Le Pen.

According to Berstein, "It is no exaggeration to say that Gaullism has molded post-war France. At the same time, considering that the essence of Gaullist ideas are now accepted by everyone, those who wish to be the legitimate heirs of de Gaulle (e.g., Jacques Chirac of the RPR) now have an identity crisis. It is difficult for them to distinguish themselves from other political perspectives." Not all Gaullist ideas have endured, however. Between the mid-1980s and the early 2000s, there have been several periods of cohabitation (1986–1988, 1993–1995, 1997–2002), in which the president and prime minister have been from different parties, a marked shift from the "imperial presidency" of de Gaulle. De Gaulle's economic policy, based on the idea of dirigisme (state stewardship of the economy), has also weakened. Although the major French banks, as well as insurance, telecommunications, steel, oil and pharmaceutical companies, were state-owned as recently as the mid-1980s, the French government has since then privatized many state assets.

Currents

Traditional Gaullism 
The term "traditional Gaullism" (Gaullisme traditionnel) has been used by scholars to describe the core values of Gaullism embodied by the actions and policies of Charles de Gaulle, generally in distinction with other Gaullist currents such as "social Gaullism" and "neo-Gaullism".

Resistant Gaullism (Gaullisme de Résistance) emphasizes the need for French political and military independence from potentially hostile powers, inspired by de Gaulle's role in the fight against Nazi Germany and Vichy France during World War II. The term "first-generation Chiraquian Gaullism" (Gaullisme chiraquien de première génération) has been used to describe politicians loyal to the populist stance and the opposition to European integration and the free market as initially advocated by Jacques Chirac in the late 1970s. This position was embodied in particular by Charles Pasqua and Philippe Séguin, who came to oppose Chirac's shift to neo-Gaullism during the 1990s.

Social Gaullism 
Social Gaullism (or "left-wing Gaullism") focuses on the social dimensions of Gaullism, and has often been linked by scholars to social democracy. Opposed to the class conflict analysis of Marxism, which was perceived as a threat to national unity, de Gaulle advocated instead a "capital-labour association", that is the need for the direct participation of workers in their company's financial results and management, which he believed was a necessary condition for them to take an interest in its functioning and development. This aspect of Gaullism has been promoted by the Democratic Union of Labour between 1959 and 1967, and by politicians like René Capitant, Jacques Chaban-Delmas, Jean Charbonnel, Léo Hamon,  or Jean Mattéoli.

Neo-Gaullism 
"Neo-Gaullism" has been used in the literature to describe a movement that emerged after the death of de Gaulle in 1970 and drew more influence from economic liberalism. Many aspects of neo-Gaullism, such as support for the Maastricht Treaty (1992) and French rapprochement with NATO under Chirac's presidency, have been described as difficult to reconcile with the historical idea of Gaullism. However, key components of Gaullism have remained, including the concept of a strong, independent state, the unity of the French people and references to de Gaulle's leadership. Neo-Gaullists have also conserved in some aspects the idea that France has a role to play in containing the world's "hyperpowers", as seen in Chirac's refusal to follow the US in the Iraq War in 2003.

Pompidolian Gaullism (Gaullism pompidolien) highlights the need for France to adapt its economy in an increasingly competing world that may threaten social peace at home, in the legacy of French president Georges Pompidou (1969–1974). "Second-generation Chiraquian Gaullism" (or "Chiraquian neo-Gaullism"), which emerged in the mid-1980s, has been influenced by neoliberalism and is more open to European integration, in the legacy of French president Jacques Chirac (1995–2007).

Gaullist political parties 
The following is a list of Gaullist political parties and their successors:
 1947–1955: Rally of the French People (RPF)
 1954–1958: National Centre of Social Republicans (RS)
 1958–1962: Union for the New Republic (UNR)
 1958–1962: Democratic Union of Labour (UDT)
 1962–1967: Union for the New Republic – Democratic Union of Labour (UNR – UDT)
 1967–1976: Union of Democrats for the Republic (UDR)
 1974-1980's: Democrats Movement (MDD)
 1976–2002: Rally for the Republic (RPR)
 1993-2003: Citizen Movement (MDC)
 1994-2018: Movement for France  (MPF)
 1999–2011: Rally for France (RPF)
 2002–2015: Union for a Popular Movement (UMP)
 2003–present: Citizen and Republican Movement (MRC)
 2008–2014: Debout la République (DLR)
 2014–present: Debout la France (DLF)
 2015–present: The Republicans (LR)
 2017–present: The Patriots (LP)
 2018–present: Citizen Movement (MDC)

See also 
 Foreign policy of Charles de Gaulle
 "Vive le Québec libre!" speech

References

Bibliography 
 Choisel, Francis, Bonapartisme et gaullisme, Paris, Albatros, 1987.
 Choisel, Francis, Comprendre le gaullisme, L'Harmattan, 2016.
 Gordon, Philip H. A Certain Idea of France: French Security Policy and the Gaullist Legacy (1993) online edition
 Grosser, Alfred. French foreign policy under De Gaulle (1977)
 Jackson, Julian. De Gaulle (2018) 887pp; the most recent major biography.
 
 Kulski, W. W. De Gaulle and the World: The Foreign Policy of the Fifth French Republic (1966) online free to borrow
 Touchard, Jean, Le gaullisme (1940–1969), Paris, Seuil, coll. Points Histoire.1978.
 

Charles de Gaulle
Conservatism in France
Nationalism in France
Eponymous political ideologies
Populism
Politics of France
French Resistance
Progressive conservatism